Truman Linden Chiles (March 22, 1933  – May 15, 2013) was an American character actor.

Early years
Chiles was born in St. Louis, Missouri but grew up in Barrington, Illinois. He graduated from Northwestern University with a Bachelor of Arts degree in journalism (majoring in advertising). He also studied at Purdue University and UCLA and served in the Army.

Career
Chiles portrayed Charles Hanson on CBS's East Side/West Side, Steve Kirkland on NBC's Convoy, Henry DeWitt on NBC's Banacek, and Paul Hunter on NBC's James at 15.

Chiles made four guest appearances on CBS's Perry Mason; in three of the episodes he played the role of the defendant: Joe Davies in "The Case of the Jealous Journalist" (1961), Herbert Simms in "The Case of the Promoter's Pillbox" (1962), and Clyde Darrell in "The Case of the Telltale Tap" (1965).  In his other appearance he played the role of murderer Vernon Elliot in the 1963 episode, "The Case of the Surplus Suitor".

In 1967, Chiles guest-starred on Mannix in the episode “Turn Every Stone".

Chiles guest-starred on such television series as Going My Way; The Fugitive; The Man from U.N.C.L.E.; The Time Tunnel; Land of the Giants; The Invaders; The Munsters; The Rockford Files; Barnaby Jones; The Twilight Zone;  The Virginian; Cannon; Simon & Simon; Quincy, M.E.; Murder, She Wrote; Falcon Crest; and Baywatch, among many others.

Death
Linden Chiles died on May 15, 2013, after falling from the roof of his home in Topanga, California. He was 80 years old.

Selected filmography

The Wizard of Baghdad (1960) – Soldier (uncredited)
Sanctuary (1961) – Randy
Wild in the Country (1961) – Doctor (uncredited)
Marnie (1964) – Office Worker (uncredited)
Shock Treatment (1964) – Al Simon – Intern (uncredited)
A Rage to Live (1965) – Brock Caldwell
Incident at Phantom Hill (1966) – Dr. Hanneford
Texas Across the River (1966) – Yellow Knife
Counterpoint (1968) – Lt. Long
Eye of the Cat (1969) – Bendetto
Who Is the Black Dahlia? (1975, TV Movie) – Dr. Coppin
Helter Skelter (1976, TV Movie) – J. Miller Leavy
Where the Buffalo Roam (1980) – Reporter #2
Forbidden World (1982) – Dr. Gordon Hauser
The Incredible Hulk (1982) - T.H. Cunningham Cloak & Dagger (1984) – Airport Security ChiefGirl Talk (1989) – Hal FrostThe Forbidden Dance (1990) – Bradley AndersonAmore! (1993) – B.S. ScarboroughThe Glass Shield (1994) – Sergeant Berry FosterFly Away Home (1996) – Television AnchorThe Annihilation of Fish (1999) – DoctorOld Friends (2010) – Craig HargrovesThree Shadows (2010) – Lord Henry / Zebulon WhatleyMr. Twistedface (2011) – Stephan DeRossilliniThe Mystic Tales of Nikolas Winter (2012) – Nikolas WinterThe Burning Within (2012) – Sgt. Craig HargrovesBrother Drop Dead (2012) – Bud StiltnerThe Haunted Men (2013) – Craig HargrovesDoctor Mabuse (2013) – Inspector Norbert Von WenkThe Rising Light (2013) – Nikolas WinterRoad to Paloma'' (2014) – Bob (final film role)

References

External links

1933 births
2013 deaths
American male film actors
American male television actors
Male actors from St. Louis
People from Topanga, California
Accidental deaths from falls
20th-century American male actors